Pressclub Information Agency (PIA) is a Bulgarian news agency.

History 

Pressclub Information Agency (PIA) is one of the newest in Bulgaria. On December 8, 2008 she started as an information website. Transformation in Information Agency began in 2009.

Pressclub Information Agency (PIA) aim to provide their own content for Bulgarian and foreign electronic and print media - newspapers, magazines, radios, televisions, electronic media, central and regional media as well as government institutions and NGOs in Bulgaria and Europe.

News of the Pressclub Information Agency (PIA) cover the events of political, social and cultural life in Bulgaria and abroad. The Agency is independent of political parties and corporate interests.

For a modest time of 3 years, the agency has broadcast over 100 thousand posts and thousands of loyal users. It managed to establish itself as an objective and independent electronic media and to gain the trust of its users.

Opportunities 

Agency actively take advantage of various channels to reach more easily to their readers. Twitter is one of the main channels with a channel for emergency text messages. Moreover, the agency has a news page on Facebook.

To any material or instant message has an opportunity to comment on the readers, using social attachment on Facebook.

The Agency provides its readers and full coverage of live event in text and video, with an option for readers to join the flow of short messages with their opinions, comments and / or additional information.

External links 
 PIA website
 Twitter - Twitter main account

News agencies based in Bulgaria